Toluviejo is a town and municipality located in the Sucre Department, northern Colombia.

References
 Gobernacion de Sucre - Toluviejo
  Cafe Internet Toluviejo Sucre - compuserver

Sucre